The Temple of Taffeh is an ancient Egyptian temple which was presented to the Netherlands for its help in contributing to the historical preservation of Egyptian antiquities in the 1960s during the International Campaign to Save the Monuments of Nubia. The temple was built of sandstone between 25 BCE and 14 CE during the rule of the Roman emperor Augustus. It was part of the Roman fortress known as Taphis and measures . The north temple's "two front columns are formed by square pillars with engaged columns" on its four sides. The rear wall of the temple interior features a statue niche.

In 1960, in relation to the construction of the Aswan High Dam and the consequent threat posed by its reservoir to numerous monuments and archeological sites in Nubia such as the temple of Abu Simbel, UNESCO made an international call to save these sites. In gratitude, Egypt assigned several monuments to the countries that replied to this plea in a significant way, including the Netherlands. Adolf Klasens, the director of the Rijksmuseum van Oudheden and a Dutch Egyptologist played a part in arranging the agreement where Egypt presented the temple of Taffeh to the Rijksmuseum van Oudheden in Leiden, the Netherlands.

This building is constructed from 657 blocks weighing approximately 250 tons. After arriving in the Netherlands in 1979, it was reconstructed in a new wing of the National Museum of Antiquities (Rijksmuseum van Oudheden) in Leiden. The new structure was designed in such a way that the Dutch weather would not affect the stone, that natural light would illuminate the temple and that visitors could see the temple before having to pay for admission. There was also an effort to replace a minimum number of damaged stones.

A Greek inscription and a Christian cross remain carved into its walls.

See also
The four temples donated to countries assisting the relocation are:
 Temple of Debod (Madrid, Spain)
 Temple of Dendur (Metropolitan Museum of Art, New York, United States)
 Temple of Taffeh  (Rijksmuseum van Oudheden in Leiden, the Netherlands)
 Temple of Ellesyia (Museo Egizio, Turin, Italy)

References

Egyptian temples
Monuments and memorials in the Netherlands
International Campaign to Save the Monuments of Nubia
Buildings and structures in Leiden
Egypt–Netherlands relations